Georgi Vladimirovich Popov (12 December 1912 – 13 April 1974) was a Soviet weightlifter. In 1946 he won a bronze medal at the world championships, and next year a European silver. Between 1934 and 1939 he set 20 unofficial world records in various events.

During his 33-year-long career Popov competed in all weight categories, from featherweight to heavyweight. In retirement he worked as a weightlifting coach. He was a vocal opponent of doping in sport.

References

1912 births
1974 deaths
Soviet male weightlifters
European Weightlifting Championships medalists
World Weightlifting Championships medalists